Fillingham is a village and civil parish in the West Lindsey district of Lincolnshire, England.

Fillingham Grade II* listed Anglican church is dedicated to St Andrew. Originally a building in Early English and Decorated style, it was largely rebuilt in 1777 with a new chancel and tower. It was further restored in 1866. The earliest element is a c.1200 round-headed doorway in the west transept. John Wycliffe was rector of the village from 1361 to 1368.

There is evidence of a Roman camp in the village and Anglo Saxon pottery has also been found. Archaeological excavations have also found evidence of an Anglo Saxon cemetery which may have been associated with a second church in the village.

Fillingham Castle is a castellated mansion built in 1760 by Sir Cecil Wray. A nearby stone manor house was built about a century before.

Fillingham Lake is one of the sources of the River Till, a small river whose lower reaches form the Fossdyke Navigation.

References

External links

"Fillingham", Genuki.org.uk. Retrieved 28 July 2011

Villages in Lincolnshire
Civil parishes in Lincolnshire
West Lindsey District